Godzilla Street is a street named after Godzilla in Kabukichō, Shinjuku, Tokyo, Japan.

See also
 Godzilla head
 Godzilla in popular culture
 Shinjuku Toho Building

External links
 

Godzilla (franchise)
Shinjuku
Streets in Tokyo
Tourist attractions in Tokyo